The Kogelbeen Cave forms part of eight caves on the dolomitic Ghaap Plateau of the Northern Cape, South Africa. It is commonly known as Kogelbeengrotte in Afrikaans. The cave is located on Kogelbeen Farm in Pixley ka Seme District Municipality. It is the longest known cave in the Northern Cape with a length of 788 meters. The Kogelbeen Cave has a diverse fauna with over 39 species living in five life zones within the cave.

History
The cave was first described in speleological literature in 1964. The cave is classified as a South African Natural Heritage Site under the South African Natural Heritage programme

Surveys and explorations

Irish and Marais survey
The cave entrance was measured with a  doline which leads to a  sinkhole. The doline walls have some holes; however, the main site of the cave starts at the deepest and southern part of the doline. There is a collapsing overhang to the north of the cave. Along the north wall of the main chamber is a small hole in the floor. This hole leads to a narrow and moist passage known as the CO2 passage. These lethal levels of CO2 prevented further exploration. There are a few minor parallel passages linking with the bat passage. The passage has a very high ceiling which is more prominent towards the end of the passage. Westward of the main chamber lies a small crawlway which leads to a low and wide passage called the water passage. The water passage is filled with numerous shallow seepage pools.

Hitchcock survey
The 1980 Hitchcock survey differs from the Irish & Marais survey with regards to the CO2 passage. Hitchcock penetrated the CO2 passage all the way to the water table, but makes no mention of the lethal carbon dioxide levels. The air composition is described as 'very good'. Hitchcock measured the water table level in the water passage at 53 m unlike the 57 m measured from the Irish and Marais survey.

The current lethal CO2 levels make it near impossible to confirm Hitchcock's measurements of the carbon dioxide passage.

Climate
The relative humidity in the water passage and the bat passage reaches 100%. The humidity drops to 98% in the main chamber and 80% in the entrance passage. Subjective commentary on the carbon dioxide levels over time indicate an increase in CO2 over the past two decades. Hitchcock reported no CO2 levels after penetrating both the water passage and the carbon dioxide passage in 1980. Irish and Marais reported high CO2 in the water passage and lethal CO2 presence in the CO2 passage in 1991. The survey in 1997 found the water passage to be even more uncomfortable with the high CO2 composition of the air and the CO2 passage impossible to survey.

Life zones
There are five life zones in the cave that are distinguishable namely: 
 The entrance zone includes the doline as well as the twilight cave areas (seven taxa)
 The dark dry zone includes the dry passage (nine taxa)
 The wet zone includes the main passage, water passage and bat passage (twenty four taxa)
 The CO2 zone includes the CO2 passage (two taxa)
 The aquatic zone includes the groundwater pools and one taxon

Biospeleology
Animals found using the doline and entrance of the Kogelbeen Cave include:
 Chacma baboon
 Rock hyrax
 Cape porcupine
 Rock pigeons
 Pale-winged starlings
 Western barn owls
 Boettger's dainty frogs
 Opilionid spiders

The doline serves well for moisture-loving creatures who would otherwise not survive in other areas of Kogelbeen.
The Kogelbeen cave also functions as an important bat roost being home to three bat species, including the common bent-wing bat with a population of over 60,000, the Geoffroy's horseshoe bat and the Darling's horseshoe bat, with a combined population of about 5000. Other bat species found include: 
 Dent's horseshoe bat
 Egyptian slit-faced bat
 Cape hairy bat
 Cape serotine
 Egyptian free-tailed bat

These bats are mostly found in the main chamber as well as the bat passage. Considering the large population of bats, unexpectedly thin guano deposits are found.

Species that are dependent on the guano deposits include: 
 A white fungus that grows on the guano as well as bat remains,
 Psychodidae flies commonly found in the bat passage with multitudes of their nematocerous larvae found in wet guano,
 Flies including the Camillidae D. barraclough, pers. com and another two unidentifiable species

Detritivores that feed on older guano deposits include: 
 Isopods from the Oniscus species as well as small red mites of the Uropodidae family, 
 Lepidospora species are only found in the carbon dioxide passage,
 Crickets such as Orthoptera and Gryllidae,
 Ptinidae beetles (Mezium species),
 unidentified Psocoptera,
 Eurycho species Coleptera and Tenebrionidae as well as 
 Large hairy caterpillars - Lepidoptera larvae

Predators in the Kogelbeen Cave include: 
A large variety of spiders but mostly Gnaphosidae, Dictynida and other Ariadne species
 Assassin spiders Reduviidae

Parasites in the Kogelbeen cave include the mite of the Argus species Argasidae, which feed on the birds and bats of the cave.

Aquatic fauna in the cave include stygobiotic amphipod Sternophysinx Basilobata, which is only found from Kogelbeen.

There is a mammal checklist of the species found in the cave at the Bloemfontein National Museum.

Deaths
The community members around the Kogelbeen cave believe that an unspecified person died in the cave. It is believed that there is an unknown disease that exists in the cave. Smith reported that some of the members of his team fell ill due to histoplasmosis. Hitchcock's party used masks as a preventative measure against unknown diseases. No recorded members of the Irish and Marais party were affected by illness from the Kogelbeen cave.

Development potential
Griekwastad publicity association has sought assessments of the cave as a possible tourism area. Factors that result in the cave being unfavourable for tourism include difficulty in movement around the cave, lack of cave formations, unpleasant CO2 conditions in some areas, and threat of disease. Fishing enthusiasts frequently use the areas in the cave for fishing using a man-made outpost structure. Further tourist development would result in a major loss of the bat species, thus threatening the rest of the fauna.

See also
Cango Caves
Wonderwerk Cave
Sacred caves of the Basotho
Boesmansgat

References

External links
 https://geographic.org/geographic_names/name.php?uni=-1819957&fid=5710&c=south_africa
Northern Cape Tourism
NC Provincial Government

 
Archaeological sites in South Africa
South African heritage sites
Archaeological sites of Southern Africa